Alkington is a hamlet in Shropshire, England, near Whitchurch and south of that town.

The village is on limestone and is residential.

Alkington Hall
Alkington Hall was a late 16th-century country house, now a Grade II* listed farmhouse.

It was constructed in two storeys of red brick with grey brick diapering and grey sandstone ashlar dressings and a plain tile and slate roofs to an L-shaped floor plan.

It was built in 1592, probably for the London merchant, William Cotton.  His son Rowland was an MP for Newcastle-under-Lyme for many years and High Sheriff of Shropshire for 1616.

Some alterations and improvements were made in the late 19th century. It was saved from a fire in 2010 when in the ownership of John and Elaine Fearnall.

References

External links
 
 

Villages in Shropshire